Married to a Mormon is a 1922 silent British drama film directed by H. B. Parkinson and starring Evelyn Brent, Clive Brook and George Wynn. The film is anti-Mormon and involves the taking of young virginal English women to Utah to become wives. It is considered to be a lost film.

Cast
 Evelyn Brent as Beryl Fane
 Clive Brook as Lionel Daventry
 George Wynn as Philip Lorimer
 Booth Conway as Bigelow
 Molly Adair

See also
Trapped by the Mormons

References

External links

1922 films
1922 drama films
1922 lost films
British drama films
British silent feature films
British black-and-white films
Criticism of Mormonism
Films directed by H. B. Parkinson
Lost British films
Lost drama films
Mormonism in fiction
Works about polygamy in Mormonism
1920s British films
Silent drama films